Gustaf “Gustavovitch” Magnus Armfelt (April 2, 1792 – July 8, 1856) was a Swedish-Finnish-Russian lieutenant general, governor and statesman.

Biography 
Armfelt's parents were General, Count Gustaf Mauritz Armfelt (1757–1814) and Countess Hedvig Ulrika De la Gardie (1761–1832). He attended a military school in Berlin and in 1809 he became a cornet of the Life Guards of Horse of the Swedish army. However, Armfelt resigned from the Swedish army, moved to Finland, and in 1811 entered the service of the Russian imperial army as a second lieutenant. From 1812 he served in the 3rd Finnish Jaeger Regiment and participated in the war against Napoleon from 1812 to 1815. Armfelt became a lieutenant in 1812 and captain in 1814. He resigned from service in 1816 as a lieutenant colonel, but returned to the army as early as 1817. Armfelt served from 1817 to 1819. On the staff of the Vyborg battalion of the Finnish Jaeger Regiment and then in 1819–1820 as the first adjutant of the Finnish Corps Division of the Headquarters of the Finnish Division and as a adjutant of the Emperor. He was then 1st Commander of the Finnish Infantry Regiment 1820–1827 and 1st Commander of the Finnish sharpshooter brigade from 1827 to 1830 until the disbandment of the Finnish Army. Armfelt was promoted to colonel in 1819 and major general in 1828. He resigned from the army service as a true state councilor in 1830.

Armfelt was governor of Vaasa Province from 1830 to 1832 and governor of Uusimaa Province (from 1838 as governor) from 1832 to 1847. He received the rank of chamberlain of the imperial court in 1831 and was promoted to lieutenant general in 1834. Armfelt was last a member of the Senate's finance department from 1847 to 1853 and inspector of the Finnish sharpshooter battalions in 1854–1855. Until 1852, he owned Elimo Manor in Pohjan parish and then Käpylä Manor in Helsinki.

Armfelt was married from 1819 to Englishwoman Louise Cuthbert-Brooke (1801–1865) whose father was Colonel Thomas Brooke of the British Army. Their son was Major General Gustaf Wilhelm Artur Armfelt (1821–1880).

Gallery

Honours 
  Recipient of the Pour le Mérite, 1814.
  Knight of the Order of Malta, latest 1819.
  Knight of the Order of St. Stanislaus, 1st Class, 1833. 
  Knight of the Order of St. Anna, 1st Class, 1836.
  Knight of the Order of St. Vladimir, 2nd Class, 1843.
  Knight of the Order of St. George, 4th Class, 1843.
  Grand Cross of the Order of the Sword, 1847.
  Knight of the Order of the White Eagle, 1850.

See also
Gustaf Mauritz Armfelt
Armfelt
Magnus Brahe
Stanislaus von Engeström

References 

1792 births
1856 deaths